Barry Jones is the former chief executive of the Australian Petroleum Production and Exploration Association (APPEA).

Dirty Dozen
In a speech given in Adelaide on 20 February 2006, Clive Hamilton (director of The Australia Institute) identified Jones as one of Australia's climate change "dirty dozen" (or Greenhouse Mafia), a group of climate change deniers with considerable influence over Australian Government policy (others are : Hugh Morgan, John Eyles (AIGN), Ron Knapp, Alan Oxley, Peter Walsh, Chris Mitchell, Meg McDonald, Barry Jones (former head APPEA), Ian MacFarlane, Alan Moran, Malcolm Broomhead, and John Howard).

References

External links
 APPEA Home Page
   Oil and Gas Industry farewells Jones

Australian chief executives
Living people
Year of birth missing (living people)